This is a list of the tallest buildings in Quebec that ranks skyscrapers and high-rise buildings in the province of Quebec, Canada, by height. Buildings in five cities are included in this list; Montreal, Quebec City, Gatineau, Longueuil, and Westmount, each having buildings taller than 100 meters. The tallest building in the province is the 47-storey, 1250 René-Lévesque located in Montreal.

In Montreal, municipal regulations forbid any building from exceeding the height of Mount Royal, or 233 m (764 ft) above mean sea level. Above-ground height is further limited in most areas and a minority of the downtown land plots are allowed to contain buildings exceeding 120 metres in height. The maximum limit is currently attained by 1000 de La Gauchetière and 1250 René-Lévesque, the latter of which is shorter, but built on higher ground. To build higher than 1000 de La Gauchetière while respecting this limit would be to build on the lowest part of downtown; the maximum height there would be approximately 210 metres.

By contrast, Gatineau and Quebec City do not have building height restrictions.

Tallest buildings
This list ranks buildings in Quebec that stand at least 100 m (328 ft) tall, based on CTBUH height measurement standards. This includes spires and architectural details but does not include antenna masts. An equal sign (=) following a rank indicates the same height between two or more buildings. Freestanding observation and/or telecommunication towers, while not habitable buildings, are included for comparison purposes; however, they are not ranked. One such tower is the Tour de Montréal.

Tallest under construction or proposed

Under construction
The following is a list of buildings that are under construction in Quebec and are planned to rise at least .

Proposed
The following is a list of buildings that have been proposed, but not approved yet, in Quebec and are planned to rise at least 100 metres (328 ft).

Timeline of tallest buildings

This lists buildings that once held the title of tallest building in Montreal.

See also

 List of tallest buildings in Canada
 List of tallest buildings in Ontario
 Canadian Centre for Architecture

Notes

References

Quebec
Buildings, tallest
Tallest